Barrali is a comune (municipality) in the Province of South Sardinia in the Italian region Sardinia, located in the Trexenta about  north of Cagliari.

Barrali borders the following municipalities: Donorì, Ortacesus, Pimentel, Samatzai, Sant'Andrea Frius.

References

External links 

 
 www.barrali.net
 www.sagradelpane.org

Cities and towns in Sardinia